Stigmella karsholti is a moth of the family Nepticulidae. It is only known from northern Tunisia in the extensive oak forests near Ain Draham.

Adults are on wing in May.

The larvae feed on Quercus canariensis. They mine the leaves of their host plant.

External links
The Quercus Feeding Stigmella Species Of The West Palaearctic: New Species, Key And Distribution (Lepidoptera: Nepticulidae)

Nepticulidae
Endemic fauna of Tunisia
Moths described in 2003
Moths of Africa